Verdigris is the common name for blue-green, poisonous, copper-based pigments that form a patina on copper, bronze, and brass. The technical literature is ambiguous as to its chemical composition. Another source describes it as a basic copper carbonate (()2), and, when near the sea, basic copper chloride (Cu2(OH)3Cl). The alchemical symbol for verdigris is 🜨 (unicode U+1F728).

Etymology

The name verdigris comes from the Middle English vertegrez, from the Old French verte grez, meaning vert d'aigre, "green [made by action of] vinegar". The modern French writing of this word is vert-de-gris ("green of grey"), sounding like the older name verdet gris ("grey greenish"), itself a deformation of verte grez. It was used as a pigment in paintings and other art objects (as green color), mostly imported from Greece, and hence verte grez is also given another etymology as vert-de-Grèce ("green of Greece").

Manufacture
A variety of recipes have been described for obtaining this blue-green patina on copper, brass, or bronze. It was originally made by hanging copper plates over hot vinegar in a sealed pot until a green crust formed on the copper. Another method, used in the Middle Ages, was to attach copper strips to a wooden block with acetic acid, then bury the sealed block in dung. A few weeks later, the block was to be dug up, and the verdigris scraped off. In eighteenth-century Montpellier, France, it was manufactured in household cellars, "where copper plates were stacked in clay pots filled with distilled wine." The verdigris was scraped off weekly by the women of the household.  Copper(II) acetate is prepared by treatment of copper(II) hydroxide with acetic acid.

Uses

Pigment

The vivid green color of copper(II) acetate made this form of verdigris a much used pigment. Until the 19th century, verdigris was the most vibrant green pigment available and was frequently used in painting. Verdigris is lightfast in oil paint, as numerous examples of 15th-century paintings show. However, its lightfastness and air resistance are very low in other media. Copper resinate, made from verdigris by boiling it in a resin, is not lightfast, even in oil paint. In the presence of light and air, green copper resinate becomes stable brown copper oxide. 

This degradation is to blame for the brown or bronze color of grass or foliage in many old paintings, although not typically those of the Early Netherlandish painters such as Jan van Eyck, who often used normal verdigris. In addition, verdigris is a fickle pigment requiring special preparation of paint, careful layered application and immediate sealing with varnish to avoid rapid discoloration (but not in the case of oil paint).  Verdigris has the curious property in oil painting that it is initially bluish-green, but turns a rich foliage green over the course of about a month. A painting by Botticelli, The Mystical Nativity, from 1500, shows a group of angels whose blue-green costumes have discolored to a dark green.
 
Verdigris fell out of use by artists as more stable green pigments became available.

Other
Copper compounds are used as fungicides (The Merck Index , Ninth Ed., 1976). Verdigris has also been used in medicine and is identified in the Pharmacologia of John Ayrton Paris as the healing rust of the Spear of Telephus as mentioned by Homer.

A compound containing beeswax, kidney fat, and verdigris was used in medieval times in the fletching of arrows.

See also
 Bronze disease
 Green pigments
 List of colors
 List of inorganic pigments
 Patina

References

External links
 National Pollutant Inventory - Copper and compounds fact sheet
 Verdigris, ColourLex
 Making Pigments - Verdigris, Paul Grosse

Pigments
Organic pigments
Copper(II) compounds
Alchemical substances
Shades of cyan
Shades of green